Chrysozephyrus is a butterfly genus in the family Lycaenidae. They were formerly included in Thecla. The genus is diverse and ranges from Russia to northern India.

Selected species
 Chrysozephyrus ataxus – wonderful hairstreak
 Chrysozephyrus ataxus lingi Okano & Okura, 1969
 Chrysozephyrus birupa – fawn hairstreak
 Chrysozephyrus brillantinus
 Chrysozephyrus disparatus
 Chrysozephyrus disparatus pseudotaiwanus (Howarth, 1957)
 Chrysozephyrus duma – metallic green hairstreak
 Chrysozephyrus esakii (Sonan, 1940)
 Chrysozephyrus jakamensis – jakama hairstreak
 Chrysozephyrus kabrua – Kabru hairstreak
 Chrysozephyrus kabrua niitakanus (Kano, 1928)
 Chrysozephyrus khasia – tailless metallic green hairstreak
 Chrysozephyrus kirbariensis – Kirbari hairstreak
 Chrysozephyrus kuromon (Sugiyama, 1994)
 Chrysozephyrus mushaellus (Matsumura, 1938)
 Chrysozephyrus nishikaze (Araki & Sibatani, 1886)
 Chrysozephyrus paona – Paona hairstreak
 Chrysozephyrus rarasanus (Matsumura, 1939)
 Chrysozephyrus smaragdinus
 Chrysozephyrus splendidulus Murayama, 1965
 Chrysozephyrus surioia – cerulean hairstreak
 Chrysozephyrus syla – silver hairstreak
 Chrysozephyrus vittata – Tytler's hairstreak
 Chrysozephyrus yuchingkinus Murayama & Shimonoya, 1965
 Chrysozephyrus zoa – powdered green hairstreak
 Chrysozephyrus tytleri (Howarth, 1957) Manipur (Mt. Kabru), Vietnam

References

 
Theclini
Lycaenidae genera